The 2010–11 Memphis Grizzlies season was the 16th season of the franchise in the National Basketball Association (NBA), and the tenth for the franchise in Memphis. The 2010–11 Memphis Grizzlies season marked their first playoff appearance since 2006. This season also marked their first playoff win in a series in franchise history by defeating the first seeded San Antonio Spurs in 6 games in an upset, becoming the fourth eighth seed in league history to win a playoffs series against a number one seed, following the Denver Nuggets in 1994, the New York Knicks in 1999, and the Golden State Warriors in 2007.

However, the Grizzlies' season ended with a seven-game loss to the Oklahoma City Thunder in the Semifinals.

Key dates
June 24, 2010 – The 2010 NBA draft was held in New York City.
July 1, 2010 – The free agency period began.
February 8, 2011 – Tony Allen was inserted into the starting lineup in a game against Oklahoma City, in place of an injured Rudy Gay and suspended O. J. Mayo. Allen produced 27 points, five steals and three blocks while spending most of the contest guarding Kevin Durant and in a postgame interview, coined the phrase "Grit. Grind." that became part of Memphis' team identity going forward.
February 24, 2011 – The Grizzlies trade Hasheem Thabeet, DeMarre Carroll and a future first-round draft pick to the Houston Rockets for Shane Battier and Ishmael Smith. An attempted trade of O. J. Mayo to the Indiana Pacers for Josh McRoberts and a 2011 first-round draft pick did not make the trade deadline.
April 8, 2011 – The Grizzlies clinch a playoff berth after a victory over the Sacramento Kings.

Draft picks

Roster

Pre-season

Game log

|- bgcolor="#ccffcc"
| 1
| October 6
| Indiana
| 
| Rudy Gay (12)
| Marc Gasol (9)
| Mike Conley (7)
| FedExForum8,618
| 1–0
|- bgcolor="#ccffcc"
| 2
| October 7
| @ Atlanta
| 
| Acie Law (19)
| Zach Randolph (8)
| Acie Law (5)
| Philips Arena7,132
| 2–0
|- bgcolor="#ccffcc"
| 3
| October 9
| @ New Orleans
| 
| Zach Randolph (21)
| Marc Gasol (10)
| Mike Conley (4)
| New Orleans Arena11,461
| 3–0
|- bgcolor="#ccffcc"
| 4
| October 12
| @ Oklahoma City
| 
| Marc Gasol (19)
| Marc Gasol (8)
| Acie Law (6)
| BOK Center11,297
| 4–0
|- bgcolor="#ccffcc"
| 5
| October 14
| Caja Laboral
| 
| Mike Conley (27)
| Darrell Arthur (9)
| Acie Law (5)
| FedExForum7,940
| 5–0
|- bgcolor="#ccffcc"
| 6
| October 16
| Milwaukee
| 
| Rudy Gay (17)
| Rudy Gay (9)
| Acie Law (5)
| FedExForum9,767
| 6–0
|- bgcolor="#ccffcc"
| 7
| October 18
| New Orleans
| 
| Mike Conley (19)
| Darrell Arthur,Hasheem Thabeet (7)
| Mike Conley,Marc Gasol,O. J. Mayo (4)
| FedExForum8,268
| 7–0
|- bgcolor="#ccffcc"
| 8
| October 22
| @ Detroit
| 
| Marc Gasol,Sam Young (16)
| DeMarre CarrollHamed Haddadi (7)
| Mike Conley
| The Palace of Auburn Hills18,528
| 8–0
|-

Regular season

Standings

Record vs. opponents

Game log

|- bgcolor="#ffcccc"
| 1
| October 27
| Atlanta
| 
| Mike Conley (23)
| Rudy Gay (10)
| Mike Conley (8)
| FedExForum17,519
| 0–1
|- bgcolor="#ccffcc"
| 2
| October 29
| @ Dallas
| 
| Rudy Gay (21)
| Marc Gasol (15)
| Mike Conley (6)
| American Airlines Center20,060
| 1–1
|- bgcolor="#ccffcc"
| 3
| October 30
| Minnesota
| 
| O. J. Mayo (29)
| Marc Gasol (8)
| Mike Conley (11)
| FedExForum12,753
| 2–1

|- bgcolor="#ffcccc"
| 4
| November 2
| @ LA Lakers
| 
| Rudy Gay (30)
| Marc Gasol (8)
| Mike Conley (8)
| Staples Center18,997
| 2–2
|- bgcolor="#ffcccc"
| 5
| November 3
| @ Golden State
| 
| Rudy Gay (35)
| Marc Gasol (8)
| Mike Conley (13)
| Oracle Arena16,607
| 2–3
|- bgcolor="#ffcccc"
| 6
| November 5
| @ Phoenix
| 
| Rudy Gay,Marc Gasol (26)
| Zach Randolph (14)
| Mike Conley (7)
| US Airways Center16,470
| 2–4
|- bgcolor="#ccffcc"
| 7
| November 6
| @ Sacramento
| 
| Rudy Gay (32)
| Zach Randolph (11)
| Mike Conley (5)
| ARCO Arena14,085
| 3–4
|- bgcolor="#ccffcc"
| 8
| November 8
| Phoenix
| 
| Zach Randolph (23)
| Zach Randolph (20)
| Mike Conley (6)
| FedExForum10,786
| 4–4
|- bgcolor="#ffcccc"
| 9
| November 10
| Dallas
| 
| Zach Randolph (23)
| Rudy Gay,Zach Randolph (9)
| Mike Conley (5)
| FedExForum10,767
| 4–5
|- bgcolor="#ffcccc"
| 10
| November 13
| Boston
| 
| Rudy Gay (22)
| Zach Randolph (11)
| Marc Gasol (5)
| FedExForum18,119
| 4–6
|- bgcolor="#ffcccc"
| 11
| November 15
| @ Orlando
| 
| Marc Gasol (14)
| Zach Randolph,Rudy Gay (9)
| Mike Conley (8)
| Amway Center18,846
| 4–7
|- bgcolor="#ffcccc"
| 12
| November 16
| Portland
| 
| Rudy Gay (20)
| Zach Randolph (14)
| Mike Conley (6)
| FedExForum10,827
| 4–8
|- bgcolor="#ffcccc"
| 13
| November 19
| @ Washington
| 
| Zach Randolph (19)
| Zach Randolph (12)
| Mike Conley (6)
| Verizon Center13,504
| 4–9
|- bgcolor="#ccffcc"
| 14
| November 20
| Miami
| 
| Zach Randolph (21)
| Zach Randolph (13)
| Mike Conley (6)
| FedExForum18,119
| 5–9
|- bgcolor="#ccffcc"
| 15
| November 24
| Detroit
| 
| Zach Randolph (21)
| Zach Randolph (14)
| Mike Conley (7)
| FedExForum11,283
| 6–9
|- bgcolor="#ccffcc"
| 16
| November 26
| Golden State
| 
| Rudy Gay (25)
| Zach Randolph (7)
| Mike Conley (5)
| FedExForum14,753
| 7–9
|- bgcolor="#ffcccc"
| 17
| November 27
| @ Cleveland
| 
| Rudy Gay (17)
| Zach Randolph (11)
| Rudy Gay (6)
| Quicken Loans Arena20,562
| 7–10
|- bgcolor="#ccffcc"
| 18
| November 30
| LA Lakers
| 
| Mike Conley (28)
| Marc Gasol,Zach Randolph (9)
| Zach Randolph (4)
| FedExForum17,638
| 8–10

|- bgcolor="#ffcccc"
| 19
| December 1
| @ Atlanta
| 
| Rudy Gay (23)
| Zach Randolph (19)
| Mike Conley (9)
| Philips Arena11,513
| 8–11

|- bgcolor="#ffcccc"
| 20
| December 3
| Houston
| 
| Rudy Gay (29)
| Zach Randolph (8)
| Mike Conley (8)
| FedExForum14,577
| 8–12
|- bgcolor="#ffcccc"
| 21
| December 5
| @ Denver
| 
| Rudy Gay (24)
| Zach Randolph (12)
| Mike Conley (9)
| Pepsi Center15,017
| 8–13
|- bgcolor="#ffcccc"
| 22
| December 6
| @ Utah
| 
| Mike Conley (19)
| Zach Randolph (14)
| Mike Conley,Marc Gasol (5)
| EnergySolutions Arena19,131
| 8–14
|- bgcolor="#ccffcc"
| 23
| December 8
| @ Phoenix
| 
| Zach Randolph (34)
| Zach Randolph (17)
| Mike Conley (14)
| US Airways Center16,288
| 9–14
|- bgcolor="#ccffcc"
| 24
| December 11
| @ LA Clippers
| 
| Zach Randolph (18)
| Zach Randolph (13)
| Mike Conley (8)
| Staples Center14,970
| 10–14
|- bgcolor="#ccffcc"
| 25
| December 13
| Portland
| 
| Zach Randolph (25)
| Zach Randolph (20)
| Mike Conley (3)
| FedExForum10,467
| 11–14
|- bgcolor="#ccffcc"
| 26
| December 15
| Charlotte
| 
| O. J. Mayo (24)
| Marc Gasol (10)
| Mike Conley (9)
| FedExForum12,219
| 12–14
|- bgcolor="#ffcccc"
| 27
| December 17
| @ Houston
| 
| Rudy Gay,Sam Young (19)
| Zach Randolph (9)
| Mike Conley,Rudy Gay,O. J. Mayo (3)
| Toyota Center14,534
| 12–15
|- bgcolor="#ffcccc"
| 28
| December 18
| @ San Antonio
| 
| O. J. Mayo (27)
| Zach Randolph (21)
| Mike Conley (8)
| AT&T Center18,581
| 12–16
|- bgcolor="#ffcccc"
| 29
| December 21
| New Jersey
| 
| Marc Gasol (19)
| Zach Randolph (14)
| Mike Conley (8)
| FedExForum14,112
| 12–17
|- bgcolor="#ccffcc"
| 30
| December 26
| @ Indiana
| 
| Rudy Gay (30)
| Zach Randolph (16)
| Mike Conley (10)
| Conseco Fieldhouse12,630
| 13–17
|- bgcolor="#ccffcc"
| 31
| December 27
| Toronto
| 
| Zach Randolph (21)
| Tony Allen,Zach Randolph (8)
| Mike Conley,Rudy Gay (6)
| FedExForum14,971
| 14–17
|- bgcolor="#ffcccc"
| 32
| December 29
| @ Sacramento
| 
| Zach Randolph (35)
| Zach Randolph (17)
| Mike Conley (7)
| ARCO Arena12,636
| 14–18

|- bgcolor="#ffcccc"
| 33
| January 1
| @ Utah
| 
| Zach Randolph (27)
| Zach Randolph (16)
| Mike Conley (7)
| EnergySolutions Arena19,732
| 14–19
|- bgcolor="#ccffcc"
| 34
| January 2
| @ LA Lakers
| 
| Rudy Gay (27)
| Marc Gasol (10)
| Mike Conley,Marc Gasol (6)
| Staples Center18,997
| 15–19
|- bgcolor="#ccffcc"
| 35
| January 4
| Oklahoma City
| 
| Zach Randolph (31)
| Zach Randolph (16)
| Mike Conley (9)
| FedExForum12,765
| 16–19
|- bgcolor="#ccffcc"
| 36
| January 7
| Utah
| 
| Rudy Gay (28)
| Zach Randolph (11)
| Greivis Vásquez (7)
| FedExForum14,781
| 17–19
|- bgcolor="#ffcccc"
| 37
| January 8
| @ Oklahoma City
| 
| Zach Randolph (27)
| Zach Randolph (16)
| Greivis Vásquez (6)
| Oklahoma City Arena18,203
| 17–20
|- bgcolor="#ffcccc"
| 38
| January 10
| @ Charlotte
| 
| Zach Randolph (15)
| Zach Randolph (15)
| Mike Conley (7)
| Time Warner Cable Arena10,188
| 17–21
|- bgcolor="#ccffcc"
| 39
| January 12
| @ Detroit
| 
| Zach Randolph (34)
| Zach Randolph (17)
| Mike Conley (9)
| The Palace of Auburn Hills13,068
| 18–21
|- bgcolor="#ccffcc"
| 40
| January 15
| Dallas
| 
| Zach Randolph (23)
| Zach Randolph (20)
| Mike Conley (6)
| FedExForum15,812
| 19–21
|- bgcolor="#ffcccc"
| 41
| January 17
| Chicago
| 
| Zach Randolph (21)
| Zach Randolph (13)
| Mike Conley (6)
| FedExForum18,119
| 19–22
|- bgcolor="#ffcccc"
| 42
| January 19
| @ New Orleans
| 
| Mike Conley,Rudy Gay (22)
| Marc Gasol,Zach Randolph (10)
| Mike Conley,Marc Gasol,Rudy Gay (5)
| New Orleans Arena15,951
| 19–23
|- bgcolor="#ccffcc"
| 43
| January 21
| Houston
| 
| Zach Randolph (29)
| Zach Randolph (19)
| Mike Conley,Rudy Gay (5)
| FedExForum13,458
| 20–23
|- bgcolor="#ccffcc"
| 44
| January 22
| @ Milwaukee
| 
| Marc Gasol (24)
| Marc Gasol (16)
| Greivis Vásquez (4)
| Bradley Center16,157
| 21–23
|- bgcolor="#ccffcc"
| 45
| January 24
| @ Toronto
| 
| Rudy Gay (21)
| Zach Randolph (12)
| Mike Conley,Marc Gasol (4)
| Air Canada Centre14,127
| 22–23
|- bgcolor="#ffcccc"
| 46
| January 26
| @ New Jersey
| 
| Rudy Gay (22)
| Zach Randolph (16)
| Mike Conley,Marc Gasol (5)
| Prudential Center8,866
| 22–24
|- bgcolor="#ccffcc"
| 47
| January 28
| @ Philadelphia
| 
| Zach Randolph (22)
| Zach Randolph (12)
| Marc Gasol (5)
| Wells Fargo Center14,289
| 23–24
|- bgcolor="#ccffcc"
| 48
| January 29
| Washington
| 
| Zach Randolph (24)
| Zach Randolph (20)
| Mike Conley (12)
| FedExForum14,722
| 24–24
|- bgcolor="#ccffcc"
| 49
| January 31
| Orlando
| 
| Mike Conley (26)
| Zach Randolph (9)
| Mike Conley (11)
| FedExForum13,513
| 25–24

|- bgcolor="#ccffcc"
| 50
| February 2
| @ Minnesota
| 
| Zach Randolph (23)
| Zach Randolph (13)
| Mike Conley (9)
| Target Center12,662
| 26–24
|- bgcolor="#ccffcc"
| 51
| February 4
| Cleveland
| 
| Zach Randolph (29)
| Zach Randolph (13)
| Mike Conley (8)
| FedExForum11,932
| 27–24
|- bgcolor="#ffcccc"
| 52
| February 5
| @ Houston
| 
| Zach Randolph (22)
| Zach Randolph (17)
| Mike Conley (5)
| Toyota Center18,195
| 27–25
|- bgcolor="#ffcccc"
| 53
| February 7
| LA Lakers
| 
| Sam Young (22)
| Marc Gasol,Zach Randolph (12)
| Mike Conley,Zach Randolph (4)
| FedExForum18,119
| 27–26
|- bgcolor="#ccffcc"
| 54
| February 8
| @ Oklahoma City
| 
| Zach Randolph (31)
| Zach Randolph (14)
| Mike Conley,Zach Randolph (4)
| Oklahoma City Arena17,868
| 28–26
|- bgcolor="#ccffcc"
| 55
| February 11
| Milwaukee
| 
| Mike Conley (23)
| Rudy Gay (10)
| Mike Conley (8)
| FedExForum14,749
| 29–26
|- bgcolor="#ccffcc"
| 56
| February 13
| Denver
| 
| Darrell Arthur (24)
| Zach Randolph (16)
| Mike Conley (5)
| FedExForum15,398
| 30–26
|- bgcolor="#ccffcc"
| 57
| February 15
| Philadelphia
| 
| Mike Conley (22)
| Zach Randolph (10)
| Zach Randolph (7)
| FedExForum11,197
| 31–26
|- align="center"
|colspan="9" bgcolor="#bbcaff"|All-Star Break 
|- bgcolor="#ffcccc"
| 58
| February 22
| @ Denver
| 
| Tony Allen (26)
| Tony Allen,Zach Randolph (8)
| Jason Williams (9)
| Pepsi Center14,638
| 31–27
|- bgcolor="#ccffcc"
| 59
| February 23
| @ Minnesota
| 
| Zach Randolph (24)
| Zach Randolph (10)
| Mike Conley (9)
| Target Center11,497
| 32–27
|- bgcolor="#ccffcc"
| 60
| February 26
| Sacramento
| 
| Zach Randolph (23)
| Zach Randolph (12)
| Jason Williams (5)
| FedExForum16,028
| 33–27
|- bgcolor="#ffcccc"
| 61
| February 27
| @ San Antonio
| 
| Zach Randolph (24)
| Zach Randolph (17)
| Marc Gasol (7)
| AT&T Center18,581
| 33–28

 
|- bgcolor="#ccffcc"
| 62
| March 1
| San Antonio
| 
| Darrell Arthur,Zach Randolph (21)
| Zach Randolph (10)
| Mike Conley (9)
| FedExForum13,480
| 34–28
|- bgcolor="#ffcccc"
| 63
| March 4
| New Orleans
| 
| Zach Randolph (20)
| Zach Randolph (11)
| O. J. Mayo (6)
| FedExForum15,367
| 34–29
|- bgcolor="#ccffcc"
| 64
| March 6
| @ Dallas
| 
| Zach Randolph (27)
| Shane Battier (11)
| Mike Conley (10)
| American Airlines Center20,102
| 35–29
|- bgcolor="#ccffcc"
| 65
| March 7
| Oklahoma City
| 
| Tony Allen,Mike Conley (20)
| Shane Battier,O. J. Mayo (7)
| Mike Conley (9)
| FedExForum13,903
| 36–29
|- bgcolor="#ffcccc"
| 66
| March 9
| New York
| 
| Tony Allen (22)
| Zach Randolph (11)
| Mike Conley (6)
| FedExForum17,512
| 36–30
|- bgcolor="#ffcccc"
| 67
| March 12
| @ Miami
| 
| O. J. Mayo (19)
| Zach Randolph (9)
| Mike Conley (10)
| American Airlines Arena19,600
| 36–31
|- bgcolor="#ccffcc"
| 68
| March 14
| @ LA Clippers
| 
| Zach Randolph (30)
| Zach Randolph (12)
| Mike Conley (5)
| FedExForum15,989
| 37–31
|- bgcolor="#ffcccc"
| 69
| March 17
| @ New York
| 
| Mike Conley (16)
| Darrell Arthur (7)
| Mike Conley (6)
| Madison Square Garden19,763
| 37–32
|- bgcolor="#ccffcc"
| 70
| March 19
| Indiana
| 
| Tony Allen (19)
| Tony Allen (11)
| Mike Conley (9)
| FedExForum17,013
| 38–32
|- bgcolor="#ccffcc"
| 71
| March 21
| Utah
| 
| Zach Randolph (19)
| Zach Randolph (13)
| Mike Conley (11)
| FedExForum12,688
| 39–32
|- bgcolor="#ccffcc"
| 72
| March 23
| @ Boston
| 
| Leon Powe,Zach Randolph (13)
| Marc Gasol (11)
| Mike Conley (5)
| TD Garden18,624
| 40–32
|- bgcolor="#ffcccc"
| 73
| March 25
| @ Chicago
| 
| Zach Randolph (16)
| Marc Gasol (11)
| Mike Conley (6)
| United Center22,274
| 40–33
|- bgcolor="#ccffcc"
| 74
| March 27
| San Antonio
| 
| Tony Allen,Zach Randolph (23)
| Zach Randolph (11)
| Mike Conley,Marc Gasol (4)
| FedExForum17,098
| 41–33
|- bgcolor="#ccffcc"
| 75
| March 30
| Golden State
| 
| Tony Allen (21)
| Zach Randolph (13)
| Mike Conley (7)
| FedExForum13,815
| 42–33

|- bgcolor="#ccffcc"
| 76
| April 1
| @ New Orleans
| 
| Zach Randolph (28)
| Marc Gasol,Zach Randolph (10)
| Mike Conley,Zach Randolph (7)
| New Orleans Arena16,561
| 43–33
|- bgcolor="#ccffcc"
| 77
| April 2
| Minnesota
| 
| Zach Randolph (22)
| Marc Gasol (9)
| Mike Conley (9)
| FedExForum15,327
| 44–33
|- bgcolor="#ffcccc"
| 78
| April 5
| LA Clippers
| 
| Mike Conley (20)
| Marc Gasol (15)
| Mike Conley (4)
| FedExForum15,433
| 44–34
|- bgcolor="#ccffcc"
| 79
| April 8
| Sacramento
| 
| Zach Randolph (27)
| Zach Randolph (15)
| Mike Conley (8)
| FedExForum16,517
| 45–34
|- bgcolor="#ccffcc"
| 80
| April 10
| New Orleans
| 
| O. J. Mayo (18)
| Marc Gasol,Hamed Haddadi (7)
| Zach Randolph (6)
| FedExForum17,041
| 46–34
|- bgcolor="#ffcccc"
| 81
| April 12
| @ Portland
| 
| Mike Conley (17)
| Hamed Haddadi,Marc Gasol (10)
| O. J. Mayo (3)
| Rose Garden20,662
| 46–35
|- bgcolor="#ffcccc"
| 82
| April 13
| @ LA Clippers
| 
| Sam Young (22)
| Darrell Arthur (9)
| O. J. Mayo,Greivis Vásquez,Sam Young (4)
| Staples Center19,060
| 46–36
|-

Playoffs

Game log

|- bgcolor=ccffcc
| 1
| April 17
| @ San Antonio
| 
| Zach Randolph (25)
| Zach Randolph (14)
| Mike Conley (10)
| AT&T Center18,581
| 1–0
|- bgcolor=ffcccc
| 2
| April 20
| @ San Antonio
| 
| Sam Young (17)
| Marc Gasol (17)
| Mike Conley (4)
| AT&T Center18,760
| 1–1
|- bgcolor=ccffcc
| 3
| April 23
| San Antonio
| 
| Zach Randolph (25)
| Marc Gasol (9)
| Mike Conley (8)
| FedExForum18,119
| 2–1
|- bgcolor=ccffcc
| 4
| April 25
| San Antonio
| 
| Mike Conley (15)
| Marc Gasol,Zach Randolph (9)
| Mike Conley (7)
| FedExForum18,119
| 3–1
|- bgcolor=ffcccc
| 5
| April 27
| @ San Antonio
| 
| Zach Randolph (26)
| Marc Gasol (17)
| Zach Randolph (6)
| AT&T Center18,581
| 3–2
|- bgcolor=ccffcc
| 6
| April 29
| San Antonio
| 
| Zach Randolph (31)
| Marc Gasol (13)
| Mike Conley (3)
| FedExForum18,119
| 4–2

|- bgcolor=ccffcc
| 1
| May 1
| @ Oklahoma City
| 
| Zach Randolph (34)
| Marc Gasol (13)
| Mike Conley (7)
| Oklahoma City Arena18,203
| 1–0
|- bgcolor=ffcccc
| 2
| May 3
| @ Oklahoma City
| 
| Mike Conley (24)
| Marc Gasol (10)
| Mike Conley (8)
| Oklahoma City Arena18,203
| 1–1
|- bgcolor=ccffcc
| 3
| May 7
| Oklahoma City
| 
| Zach Randolph (21)
| Zach Randolph (21)
| Mike Conley,O. J. Mayo (4)
| FedExForum18,119
| 2–1
|- bgcolor=ffcccc
| 4
| May 9
| Oklahoma City
| 
| Zach Randolph (34)
| Marc Gasol (21)
| Mike Conley,O. J. Mayo (5)
| FedExForum18,119
| 2–2
|- bgcolor=ffcccc
| 5
| May 11
| @ Oklahoma City
| 
| Marc Gasol (15)
| Zach Randolph (7)
| Mike Conley,O. J. Mayo (4)
| Oklahoma City Arena18,203
| 2–3
|- bgcolor=ccffcc
| 6
| May 13
| Oklahoma City
| 
| Zach Randolph (30)
| Zach Randolph (13)
| Mike Conley (12)
| FedExForum18,119
| 3–3
|- bgcolor=ffcccc
| 7
| May 15
| @ Oklahoma City
| 
| Mike Conley (18)
| Zach Randolph (10)
| Mike Conley (6)
| Oklahoma City Arena18,203
| 3–4
|-

Player statistics

Season

|- style="text-align:center;" bgcolor=""
|  
|| 70 || 29 || 20.5 || .509 || .182 || .756 || 2.7 || 1.4 || style="background:#6082b6; color:#fc3;"| 1.80 || .59 || 8.9
|-  style="text-align:center; background:#f0f0f0;"
|  || 76 || 7 || 20.2 || .499 || .000 || .822 || 4.3 || 0.6 || .66 || .78 || 9.2 
|- style="text-align:center;" bgcolor=""
| *
|| 19 || 0 || 24.1 || .390 || .294 || style="background:#6082b6; color:#fc3;"| .900 || 4.0 || 1.4 || .79 || .53 || 4.4
|-  style="text-align:center; background:#f0f0f0;"
| * || 2 || 0 || 2.5 || .333 || .000 || .0 || 0.5 || 0.0 || .50 || .0 || 1.0
|- style="text-align:center;" bgcolor=""
| * || 7 || 0 || 5.6 || .444 || .0 || 1.000 || 1.1 || 0.3 || .14 || .14 || 1.4
|-  style="text-align:center; background:#f0f0f0;"
|  
| style="background:#6082b6; color:#fc3;"| 78 || style="background:#6082b6; color:#fc3;"| 78 || 35.6 || .444 || .368 || .736 || 3.1 || style="background:#6082b6; color:#fc3;"| 6.6 || 1.77 || .23 || 13.8
|- style="text-align:center;" bgcolor=""
|  
|| 77 || 77 || 32.1 || .528 || style="background:#6082b6; color:#fc3;"| .429 || .738 || 7.0 || 2.5 || .95 || style="background:#6082b6; color:#fc3;"| 1.65 || 11.6
|-  style="text-align:center; background:#f0f0f0;"
|  
|| 54 || 54 || style="background:#6082b6; color:#fc3;"| 39.9 || .471 || .396 || .805 || 6.2 || 2.8 || 1.69 || 1.07 || 19.8
|- style="text-align:center;" bgcolor=""
|  || 27 || 0 || 4.1 || .512 || .000 || .500 || 1.8 || 0.1 || .04 || .37 || 1.7
|-  style="text-align:center; background:#f0f0f0;"
|  || 38 || 16 || 13.9 || .406 || .118 || .635 || 1.0 || 0.5 || .29 || .08 || 4.3
|- style="text-align:center;" bgcolor=""
| * || 11 || 0 || 8.5 || .158 || .000 || .600 || 1.0 || 1.3 || .36 || .0 || 1.1
|-  style="text-align:center; background:#f0f0f0;"
|  
|| 67 || 15 || 26.3 || .409 || .370 || .738 || 2.4 || 2.0 || 1.01 || .37 || 11.2
|- style="text-align:center;" bgcolor=""
| * 
|| 12 || 0 || 8.9 || style="background:#6082b6; color:#fc3;"| .622 || .000 || .667 || 1.4 || 0.3 || .25 || .0 || 6.5
|-  style="text-align:center; background:#f0f0f0;"
|  
|| 73 || 72 || 36.4 || .502 || .190 || .759 || style="background:#6082b6; color:#fc3;"| 12.2 || 2.1 || .81 || .34 || style="background:#6082b6; color:#fc3;"| 20.0
|- style="text-align:center;" bgcolor=""
| * || 12 || 0 || 5.8 || .143 || .000 || .375 || 0.2 || 0.8 || .33 || .0 || 0.8
|-  style="text-align:center; background:#f0f0f0;"
| * || 45 || 0 || 8.2 || .436 || .0 || .543 || 1.7 || 0.1 || .20 || .33 || 1.2
|- style="text-align:center;" bgcolor=""
|  || 66 || 0 || 11.8 || .392 || .266 || .800 || 1.0 || 2.1 || .30 || .06 || 3.3
|-  style="text-align:center; background:#f0f0f0;"
| * || 11 || 0 || 11.3 || .310 || .200 || .0 || 0.7 || 2.5 || .27 || .09 || 1.9
|- style="text-align:center;" bgcolor=""
|  || 74 || 42 || 19.6 || .470 || .304 || .778 || 2.2 || 0.8 || .88 || .30 || 6.9
|}
As of April 7.
* – Stats with the Grizzlies.

Playoffs
Memphis won their first playoff series, first playoff game, and became only the second #8 seed team to defeat a #1 seed in a best of seven Playoff Series in the history of the NBA by defeating the San Antonio Spurs in six games.

Awards, records and milestones

Awards

Week/Month

Season
Zach Randolph was named to the All-NBA Third Team. It was his first All-NBA selection.
Tony Allen was named to the NBA All-Defensive Second Team. It was his first All-Defensive selection.

Milestones
The Grizzlies won the first playoff game in franchise history with a victory over the San Antonio Spurs in game 1 of their first round series.
The Grizzlies won the first home playoff game in franchise history with a victory over the San Antonio Spurs in game 3 of their first round series.
The Grizzlies won the first playoff series in franchise history with a victory over the San Antonio Spurs in game 6 of their first round series. It was also only the fourth time in NBA history an eighth-seeded team defeated a first-seeded team, and only the second time in a best-of-seven series.

Injuries and surgeries
Rudy Gay suffered a dislocated left shoulder during a February 15 victory over the Philadelphia 76ers. Gay underwent surgery on March 25 and missed the remainder of the season.
Xavier Henry missed much of the season with a knee sprain. He declined knee surgery.

Transactions

Trades

Free agents

Additions

Subtractions

References

Memphis Grizzlies seasons
Memphis
Memphis Grizzlies
Memphis Grizzlies
Events in Memphis, Tennessee